Dementyev, often spelt Dementiev (feminine: Dementyeva), is a Russian surname that is derived from the male given name Dementiy and literally means Dementiy's. Notable people with the surname include:

Dementyev
 Andrey Dementyev (disambiguation), multiple people
 Carolina Dementiev (born 1989), Panamanian model
 Georgi Petrovich Dementiev (usual spelling) (1898-1969), Russian ornithologist
 Nikolay Dementyev (footballer, born 1915) (1915–1994), Soviet football player and coach
 Oleg Dementiev (1938–1991), Russian chess master
 Peter Demens, born Pyotr Alexeyevitch Dementyev (1850–1919), Russian immigrant, railway owner and one of the founders of the U.S. city of St. Petersburg, Florida
 Pyotr Dementyev (1913-1998), Soviet football player and coach, brother of Nikolay
 Yevgeny Dementyev (born 1983), Russian cross-country skier

Dementyeva
Elena Dementieva (born 1981), Russian tennis player
Yelizaveta Dementyeva (1928–2022), Russian sprint canoer
Anna Dementyeva (born 1994), Russian artistic gymnast

Russian-language surnames